The EF 24–105mm f/4L IS USM is an EF mount wide-to-telephoto zoom lens. It was introduced by Canon in 2005 to complement the well-regarded 17–40mm f/4L USM and 70–200mm f/4L USM.

The EF 24–105mm f/4L IS USM lens is often compared to the other L series zoom of comparable range, the 24–70mm f/2.8L USM, losing one full stop but gaining image stabilization (IS) in return, stabilizing camera shake up to three stops. It also has rubber gaskets for moisture and dust protection, although weather sealing is only effective if the photographer uses a weather-resistant camera body. Some early production models of the EF 24–105mm f/4L IS USM lens had a flare problem (reportedly the first 10,000 batch) and Canon offered to repair them for free.

This EF 24–105mm f/4L IS USM lens is available in kits packaged with the EOS 5D Mk II, 5D Mk III and EOS 6D.

The EF 24-105mm f/3.5-5.6 IS STM is a newer 'low cost' alternative to the EF 24–105mm f/4L IS USM. It has the same zoom range, but a non-constant aperture range which is typical of many non-professional zoom lenses. Both lenses have image stabilization (IS). The EF 24–105mm f/4L IS USM and IS II USM version use a ring type ultrasonic motor, whereas the new EF 24-105mm f/3.5-5.6 IS STM uses Canon's STM stepper motor, which is quieter during video usage. The new EF 24-105mm f/3.5-5.6 IS STM weighs slightly less (525 g / 18.52 oz versus 670 g / 23.6 oz) and costs roughly half the price of the EF 24–105mm f/4L IS USM.

An improved version of the EF 24–105mm f/4L IS USM, the EF 24–105mm f/4L IS II USM, was announced in August 2016. It has a better image stabilizer and less distortion.
The EF 24–105mm f/4L IS II USM lens is available in kits packaged with the EOS 5D Mk IV.

On a 1.6x APS-C camera body, this lens' field of view is equivalent to that of a 38–168mm lens on a 35mm film camera; this is a very useful range, covering most normal to medium-telephoto needs.

Specs EF 24–105L IS USM lens

 The lens includes sealing against dust and water, although it is not waterproof.
 It includes an 8-bladed curved diaphragm which remains nearly circular from f/4 to f/8.
 Like many Canon L-series lenses, it uses common 77mm filters.
 Characteristic of zoom lenses, it exhibits some barrel distortion at its shortest focal length.
 It contains a single Super-UD glass element (dark blue in diagram) and 3 aspherical lens elements (green in diagram).

Specifications

References

Notes
 EF24–105mm f/4L IS USM at Canon's Camera Museum
 Service Notice at Canon USA site

Citations

External links

 canon.com: Canon EF 24–105mm f/4L IS USM
 Third party reviews:

24-105
Canon L-Series lenses
Camera lenses introduced in 2005
Camera lenses introduced in 2014